Kirk Wilson is a retired American soccer player who played professionally in Major League Soccer and the USL A-League.

Youth
Wilson’s family moved from California to El Paso, Texas when he was a child.  He graduated from Coronado High School where he was part of the 1996 Texas State High School soccer championship team.  During the summer of 1997, Wilson played for the Des Moines Menace of the USISL Premier Development Soccer League.  Wilson attended Drake University, playing on the men’s soccer team 1996 and 1997.

Professional
In 1998, Wilson left Drake soon after and moved to Germany where he spent time training with various teams.  In the spring of 1998, he returned to the United States and signed with the El Paso Patriots of the USISL A-League for the 1998 A-League season.  He was fourth in the league’s points chart, finished runner-up in the Rookie of the Year, and was Second Team All League.  In February 1999, the Dallas Burn selected Wilson in the first round (seventh overall) of the 1999 MLS Supplemental Draft.  He played five games for the Burn that season, going on loan to the Patriots in June and the MLS Project 40 team, which also competed in the USISL A-League, from June through the playoffs.  In 2000, Wilson began the MLS season with the Burn, playing one game.  On April 2, 2000, the Burn waived Wilson.  He quickly signed with the El Paso Patriots where he played the rest of the season.  In 2001, Wilson moved to the Rochester Rhinos where he was part of the Rhinos 2001 championship squad.  He spent five seasons in Rochester.  In 2005, his last season with the Rhinos, Wilson was first team All League.  In December 2005, Wilson signed as a free agent with the Montreal Impact.  Wilson retired at the end of the season and moved his family back to Des Moines, Iowa where he founded a company focused on training soccer players.

International
In 1998 and 1999, Wilson played for the United States men's national under-23 soccer team.

References

External links
 

Living people
1977 births
American soccer players
American expatriate soccer players
Austin Lone Stars players
FC Dallas players
Des Moines Menace players
Drake Bulldogs men's soccer players
El Paso Patriots players
Major League Soccer players
Montreal Impact (1992–2011) players
Rochester New York FC players
USL First Division players
MLS Pro-40 players
Expatriate soccer players in Canada
Soccer players from California
United States men's under-23 international soccer players
USL League Two players
A-League (1995–2004) players
FC Dallas draft picks
Association football forwards
Association football midfielders